Sir William Courtenay, 2nd Baronet (11 March 1676 – 6 October 1735) of Powderham Castle, Powderham,  Devon, was an English landowner, a leading member of the Devonshire gentry and Tory politician who sat in the English House of Commons from 1701 to 1707 and in the British House of Commons almost continually from 1707 to 1735.

Early life
Courtenay was the son of Colonel Francis Courtenay, MP for Devonshire from 1689 to 1699, and his wife Mary Boevey, daughter of William Boevey (died 1661), of Flaxley Abbey, Gloucestershire.  The Boevey family was of Netherlandish Huguenot descent. Mary's brother was John Boevey (died 1706) who refers to himself in his will dated 6 March 1703  as "John Boevey of Powderham Castle". Courtenay's father died in 1699, predeceasing his own father Sir William Courtenay, 1st Baronet. Courtenay succeeded his grandfather in 1702 to the baronetcy and the estate of Powderham Castle. He married Lady Anne Bertie, daughter of James Bertie, 1st Earl of Abingdon on 13 July 1704.

Career
Courtenay first stood for Parliament at Honiton at the first general election of 1701. He was defeated, but was then returned unopposed for Devonshire at the second general election of 1701. He was returned again unopposed in the general elections of 1702, 1705, and 1708. He was a moderate Tory, but opposed the impeachment of Dr. Sacheverell in 1710. He stood down at the 1710 general election in favour of Sir William Pole, but when Pole had to submit to re-election on appointment to office, Courtenay was pressured by popular demand to stand again. He defeated Pole by a massive majority at the by-election on 22 July 1712. He was returned unopposed at the 1713 general election. From 1714 to 1716 he served as Lord Lieutenant of Devon. He was returned as a Tory at the 1715 general election and was returned unopposed again at the succeeding general elections in 1722, 1727 and 1734.

Death and legacy
Courtenay died on 6 October 1735. He directed his body to be buried in the north aisle of Powderham Church "near the monument there erected". He further desired "my executor (who was his nephew William Courtenay (died 1735) of Powderham)...to bestow and lay out the summe of fifty pounds in erecting a monument near the place of interrment in such manner as my executor shall think fit". No such monument survives. His children included:
William Courtenay, 1st Viscount Courtenay
Henry Reginald Courtenay, MP.
Eleanor Courtenay (died 1765) who married John Francis Basset (1714–1757) MP for Barnstaple in 1740–1741, of Heanton Court, Heanton Punchardon.

There is a fuller list of his children in the Powderham parish registers available through FindMyPast. (Mary born 1705, William 1706, James 1707, Anna Sophia 1708, William 1709, Eleanora 1710, Bridget 1712, Henry Reginald 1714, Isabella 1716, Mary 1717, Elizabeth 1718, Peregrine 1720).
Peregrine, Anna Sophia and Isabella (wife of John Andrew of Exeter) were mentioned in a deed dated 2 May 1765 and registered in Dublin.

He left £10 each to his nieces Elizabeth, Mary, Lucy and Isabella Courtenay for mourning clothes. He also bequeathed them each the sum of £30 to buy a diamond ring each, to be worn in his memory. He bequeathed to Sir William Courtenay his nephew the sum of £100 and also made him his residuary beneficiary.

In 1831 Courtenay was recognised as having been de jure 6th Earl of Devon.

References

1676 births
1735 deaths
Lord-Lieutenants of Devon
Baronets in the Baronetage of England
English landowners
Devon, William Courtenay, 6th Earl of
English MPs 1701–1702
English MPs 1702–1705
English MPs 1705–1707
English MPs 1701
British MPs 1707–1708
British MPs 1708–1710
British MPs 1710–1713
British MPs 1713–1715
British MPs 1715–1722
British MPs 1722–1727
British MPs 1727–1734
British MPs 1734–1741
Members of the Parliament of Great Britain for Devon
Members of the Parliament of England (pre-1707) for Devon
Members of the Parliament of Great Britain for Honiton